Columbia House may refer to:

Columbia House, a music and video club
Columbia House (Columbia Falls, Maine), listed on the NRHP in Maine
An English translation of Columbia-Haus, the former name of Columbia concentration camp